The viceregal consort of New Zealand generally assists the office-holder in welcoming ambassadors and their spouses, and in performing their other official duties. The governor-general's spouse traditionally participates in celebratory occasions, attends functions and, as a patron of various voluntary associations, works to promote the activities of those associations. None of the activities have any official status. The spouse of the administrator of the Government fulfills the role when the administrator (chief justice) performs the function of the governor-general.

The current spouse (since 21 October 2021) is Richard Davies, husband of Cindy Kiro.

Both the governor-general and their spouse are entitled to the style "His/Her Excellency" during the governor-general's term of office, but not thereafter. The governor-general is entitled to the style "The Right Honourable" for life; this does not extend to the spouse.

Most of the spouses of governors-general have been content to be background figures providing the office-holder with support. Some have been all but unknown to the general New Zealand public. However, a few have been notable in their own right, and details are shown in the following table.

List of viceregal consorts of New Zealand

See also
 King consort
 Queen consort
 Spouse of the prime minister of New Zealand

References

 
 
New Zealand